The Afton Street Conservation Reserve is situated along the middle reaches of the Maribyrnong River in Essendon West, Melbourne. It is within the City of Moonee Valley and is 17 hectares (42 Acres).

History 
The Conservation park was purchased by the city council in October 2003 for a price of $900,000 (AUD). The site was formerly part of the Defence Explosive Factory Maribyrnong.

Planning 
A master landscape plan was issued for the site and won a number of design awards. The plan emphasises conservation and recreational use of the park.

Flora and fauna 
Two areas of Western Basalt Plains Grassland
25 regionally significant species of indigenous plants
potential habitat and occurrence of the nationally significant Striped Legless Lizard
areas of valuable native fauna habitat including five ‘birds of prey’ using  open grassland areas, small passerine birds including thornbills and silvereyes using the shrub layer and waterbirds using the riparian fringe

References 

Parks in Melbourne
City of Moonee Valley